Füzuli is a village in the municipality of Yeni yol in the Shamkir Rayon of Azerbaijan.

References

Populated places in Shamkir District